August Friedrich Oelenhainz (June 28, 1745 – November 5, 1804) was a German painter.

Oelenhainz's father was a preacher. He studied under his uncle Wolfgang Dietrich Mayr in Tübingen, and then later at the art school in Stuttgart with the Württemberg court painter Johann Wilhelm Beyer. In 1766 he studied at the Academy of Fine Arts Vienna. Oelenhainz moved to Vienna, where in the imperial court he rapidly became a popular painter. He primarily painted portraits. From 1790 he worked in 1792 in Zurich and Bern. From 1800 he lived in 1801 in Stuttgart and Ulm. In 1803 he traveled to Paris and on the way home died unexpectedly in 1804. Oelenhainz was never married.

The painter Susette Hirzel studied briefly with Oelenhainz.

References

Sources 
 Albert Ilg, Julius Hartmann: Oelenhainz, August Friedrich. In: Allgemeine Deutsche Biographie (ADB). Band 24. Duncker & Humblot, Leipzig 1887, p. 284ff.
 This article incorporates text translated from the corresponding German Wikipedia article.

External links 
 
 

1745 births
1803 deaths
18th-century German painters
18th-century German male artists
German male painters
19th-century German painters
19th-century German male artists